Oreste Baldini (born 8 July 1962) is an Italian actor and voice actor. After entering the film industry as a child performing in The Godfather Part II and The Flower in His Mouth, he later found a successful career as an adult dubbing in both animated and live-action films, including the Madagascar and Fast & Furious franchises.

Biography
Born in Milan, Baldini made his big international screen debut at twelve years of age in 1974. He portrayed Vito Corleone as a child in the opening scenes of The Godfather Part II. A year later, he returned to Italy and acted in the film The Flower in His Mouth.

Baldini later found success as a voice actor dubbing characters into the Italian language. He is the official Italian voice of John Cusack. He also dubbed Tim Roth, Seth Rogen, Ludacris, Crispin Glover, Johnny Depp and David Arquette in some of their movies. Baldini's Italian voice dubbing roles include King Julien XIII in the Madagascar films, Shaggy Rogers in Scooby-Doo, Courage in Courage the Cowardly Dog, Sideshow Mel in The Simpsons and Quackerjack in Darkwing Duck.

Baldini works at C.D. Cine Dubbing, LaBibi.it, Dubbing Brothers, Pumaisdue, and other Italian dubbing studios. He is the brother of voice actors Antonella, Rita and Nanni Baldini.

Filmography

Cinema
The Godfather Part II (1974)
The Flower in His Mouth (1975)

Dubbing roles

Animation
King Julien XIII in Madagascar
King Julien XIII in Madagascar: Escape 2 Africa
King Julien XIII in Madagascar 3: Europe's Most Wanted
King Julien XIII in The Penguins of Madagascar
King Julien XIII in Penguins of Madagascar (movie)
Flint Lockwood in Cloudy with a Chance of Meatballs
Flint Lockwood in Cloudy with a Chance of Meatballs 2
Crane in Kung Fu Panda 3
Shaggy Rogers in Scooby-Doo (since 2002)
Sideshow Mel in The Simpsons (seasons 2-5, 18+)
Sideshow Mel in The Simpsons Movie
Despereaux in The Tale of Despereaux
Quackerjack in Darkwing Duck
Quackerjack in DuckTales
Courage in Courage the Cowardly Dog
Various characters in Robot Chicken
Starscream in The Transformers: The Movie (2007 redub)
Jimmy Lizard in Hoodwinked!
Igor in Igor
Dusty Crophopper in Planes
Dusty Crophopper in Planes: Fire & Rescue
Thaddeus "Phlegm" Bile in Monsters, Inc.
Hamir in The Wild
XR in Buzz Lightyear of Star Command: The Adventure Begins
Siddeley in Cars 2
Arthur Claus in Arthur Christmas
Mr. Fly in Hotel Transylvania
Augustus Bumblypants in The Happytime Murders
Moonwind in Soul
Mark Chang / Norm the Genie in The Fairly OddParents
The Man with the Yellow Hat in Curious George
News Reporter in Minions
Steel Toed slim in ChalkZone

Live action
Vince Larkin in Con Air
Roy Dillon in The Grifters
Nelson Rockefeller in Cradle Will Rock
Tracy Jordan in 30 Rock
Eddie Thomas in America's Sweethearts
Mike Enslin in 1408
Stanley Phillips in Grace Is Gone
Brand Hauser in War, Inc.
David Gordon in Martian Child
Walter Simmons in CSI: Miami
Jackson Curtis in 2012
Edgar Allan Poe in The Raven
Hillary Van Wetter in The Paperboy
Robert Hansen in The Frozen Ground
Emerson Kent in The Numbers Station
Stafford Weiss in Maps to the Stars
Jack in The Bag Man
Matthew Eversmann in Black Hawk Down
Aaron Altmann in The Angriest Man in Brooklyn
Nelson in The Shadow
Older Brian Wilson in Love & Mercy
Sam in The Prince
Clay Riddell in Cell
Lucius in Dragon Blade
Linus Riley in Scream
Linus Riley in Scream 2
Linus Riley in Scream 3
Linus Riley in Scream 4
Leslie Chow in The Hangover
Leslie Chow in The Hangover Part II
Leslie Chow in The Hangover Part III
Tej Parker in 2 Fast 2 Furious
Tej Parker in Fast Five
Tej Parker in Fast & Furious 6
Tej Parker in Furious 7
Tej Parker in The Fate of the Furious
Mac Radner in Bad Neighbors
Mac Radner in Bad Neighbors 2: Sorority Rising
Kevin in 11:14
Martin Fitzgerald in Without a Trace
Shaggy Rogers in Scooby-Doo
Shaggy Rogers in Scooby-Doo 2: Monsters Unleashed
George McFly in Back to the Future
Ranger Smith in Yogi Bear
Max in The Muppet Movie
George McFly in Back to the Future
Dennis Riley in Malice
Mr. Dickey in The Mask
Jeff Foster in Super Troopers
Steve Sanders in Beverly Hills, 90210
Tom Wingfield in The Glass Menagerie
Mr. Orange / Freddy Newandyke in Reservoir Dogs
Philip Chaney in Captives
Charles Ferry in Everyone Says I Love You
Junior in Panic Room
Jake Scharm in Keeping the Faith
Damon Schmidt in The Kingdom
Jolly in Valerian and the City of a Thousand Planets
Alexander "Stretch" Rawland in Gridlock'd
Max Abbitt in Kissing a Fool
Gig in Lucky Numbers
D.J. Drake / Brendan Fraser in Looney Tunes: Back in Action
Mr. Bucket in Charlie and the Chocolate Factory
Simon in The Walking Dead
Ted Newman in Click
Ed Wood in Ed Wood

Video games
Wa-Wa in Crash Bandicoot: The Wrath of Cortex
Narrator in Call of Duty: Modern Warfare 3

References

External links

1962 births
Living people
Italian male child actors
Italian male film actors
Italian male video game actors
Italian male voice actors
Male actors from Milan
Italian voice directors
20th-century Italian male actors
21st-century Italian male actors